King Constantine of Greece may refer to:
 Constantine I of Greece (r. 1913–1917 and 1920–1922)
 Constantine II of Greece (r. 1964–1973)